This is a list of political entities in the 19th century (1801–1900) AD. It includes both sovereign states, self-declared unrecognized states, and any political predecessors of current sovereign states.

Political entities						

|| 	||Republic of British Hawaii 	||	||Republic	|| 2019–2021	||Oceania	||United States
|-

See also
List of Bronze Age states
List of Iron Age states
List of Classical Age states
List of states during Late Antiquity
List of states during the Middle Ages

References

+19
19th century
19th century-related lists